André-Marie Alfred Rabel (20 March 1878 – 21 January 1934) was a French fencer. He competed in the men's épée event at the 1900 Summer Olympics.

References

External links
 

1878 births
1934 deaths
French male épée fencers
Olympic fencers of France
Fencers at the 1900 Summer Olympics
Fencers from Paris
Place of death missing